The Graffam Development Historic District is a residential area located in the American town of Brookline, Massachusetts. It encompasses the best-preserved portion of a historic residential subdivision, platted and built between 1894 and 1907.  The land was purchased by Peter Graffam, who built a variety of Queen Anne and Colonial Revival houses on Babcock Street, Abbottsford Road, Manchester Road, Stedman Street, and Naples Road in Brookline, Massachusetts.  Graffam also developed Osborne Street, but most of its houses have since been modified, losing historic integrity.  The district was listed on the National Register of Historic Places in 1985.

See also
National Register of Historic Places listings in Brookline, Massachusetts

References

Historic districts in Norfolk County, Massachusetts
Colonial Revival architecture in Massachusetts
Queen Anne architecture in Massachusetts
Brookline, Massachusetts
National Register of Historic Places in Brookline, Massachusetts
Historic districts on the National Register of Historic Places in Massachusetts